Mestdagh is a Belgian surname. Notable people with the name include:

Hanne Mestdagh (born 1993), Belgian basketball player 
Kim Mestdagh (born 1990), Belgian basketball player
Niels Mestdagh (born 1993), Belgian footballer
Paul Mestdagh (born 1947), Belgian volleyball player
Philip Mestdagh (born 1963), Belgian basketball coach